Vinkus may refer to:

Antanas Vinkus, Lithuanian diplomat
Vinkus, an area in the fictional Winkie Country in the Land of Oz